Sylvia A Lewis (born 23 December 1941) is a British former swimmer. She competed at the 1960 Summer Olympics and the 1964 Summer Olympics.

She also represented England in the 110 yards backstroke at the 1958 British Empire and Commonwealth Games in Cardiff, Wales. Four years later she won a silver medal in the 220 yards backstroke and a bronze medal in the 110 yards backstroke at the 1962 British Empire and Commonwealth Games in Perth, Western Australia.

References

1941 births
Living people
British female swimmers
Olympic swimmers of Great Britain
Swimmers at the 1960 Summer Olympics
Swimmers at the 1964 Summer Olympics
Place of birth missing (living people)
Commonwealth Games medallists in swimming
Commonwealth Games silver medallists for England
Commonwealth Games bronze medallists for England
Swimmers at the 1958 British Empire and Commonwealth Games
Swimmers at the 1962 British Empire and Commonwealth Games
20th-century British women
Medallists at the 1962 British Empire and Commonwealth Games